Cadra corniculata is a species of snout moth in the genus Cadra. It was described by Marianne Horak in 1994. It is found in western Australia.

The wingspan is 15–18 mm for males and 14–17 mm for females. Adults are light grey, strongly sprinkled with white.

References

Phycitini
Moths described in 1994
Taxa named by Marianne Horak
Moths of Australia